The 1948 All-Eastern football team consists of American football players chosen by various selectors as the best players at each position among the Eastern colleges and universities during the 1948 college football season.

All-Eastern selections

Backs
 George Sella, Princeton (AP-1)
 Levi Jackson, Yale (AP-1)
 Bobby Stuart, Army (AP-1)
 Lou Kusserow, Columbia (AP-1)

Ends
 Dale Armstrong, Dartmouth (AP-1)
 Sam Tamburo, Penn State (AP-1)

Tackles
 Ernie Stautner, Boston College (AP-1)
 Richard Clark, Cornell (AP-1)

Guards
 Joseph Henry, Army (AP-1)
 Joseph Drazenovich, Penn State (AP-1)

Centers
 Chuck Bednarik, Penn (AP-1)

Key
 AP = Associated Press

See also
 1948 College Football All-America Team

References

All-Eastern
All-Eastern college football teams